Shakti Ballav Aryal (also known as Shakti Ballav Arjyal or Shakti Ballabh Aryal) was a Nepalese writer, translator, and a Hindu priest.

Aryal has translated numerous Sanskrit works in the Nepali-language including Mahabharat Virat Parva (1771), and  Hansyakadamba (1789).

He first wrote Hansyakadamba in Sanskrit and later translated it to Nepali. Aryal served as royal priest to Prithvi Narayan Shah, and Pratap Singh Shah.

His nephew Udayananda Aryal, and Radha Ballav Aryal were also writers.

In 2017, Shakti Ballav Aryal and Bhanubhakta Acharya were praised as their work "laid the adamant foundation for Nepali literature". Aryal was also described to be a "pioneer in humour".

Works 

 Tanahun Bhakundo (1762)
 Mahabharat Virat Parva (1771)
 Hansyakadamba (1789)

References 

Nepalese Hindus
Nepalese male poets
Nepalese translators
Nepali-language poets
People from Gorkha District
Translators from Sanskrit
Translators to Nepali
Khas people
18th-century Nepalese writers